Keokuk Township is a township in Wapello County, Iowa, USA.

History
Keokuk Township was organized in 1846.

References

Townships in Wapello County, Iowa
Townships in Iowa